Sergo Vardosanidze  is a Georgian historian. He serves as the Professor and Rector of the Saint Andrew the First-Called Georgian University of the Patriarchate of Georgia.

Early life 
He graduated from Sulkhan-Saba Orbeliani in Tbilisi State Pedagogical Institute. He completed a postgraduate course at Iv. Javakhishvili Institute of History and Ethnology of Academy of Sciences of Georgia, specializing in History of Georgia. PhD (History), Professor.

Career 
He worked at K.D.Ushinski #1 experimental school as a history teacher and deputy headmaster. At Sulkhan-Saba Orbeliani Tbilisi Pedagogical University he was an associate professor, full professor of Georgian history, and chair and dean of Department of History. He was pro-rector and Georgian History Chair at Tbilisi Ecclesiastical Academy and Seminary.

Books 
 Kyrion II, His Holiness and Beatitude, Catholicos-Patriarch of all Georgia. Orthodox Cypsela Publishers (Greece), 1993, 30 pages
 Georgian Church (in English), Tbilisi, 1999, 14 pages (in German), Tbilisi, 1999, 15 pages
 Textbook of Georgian History, co-authors – R.Meterveli, I.Antelava
 Methods of Teaching History (Course of lectures, co-authors – Z.Chimakadze, I.Tskitishvili)
 Leonid, His Holiness and Beatitude, Catholicos-Patriarch of all Georgia. Tbilisi, 2000, 45 pages
 Georgian Orthodox Apostolic Church in 1917–1952. Metsniereba publishing house, Tbilisi, 2000 (a monograph), 323 pages
 Secondary school of Village Zovreti, Zestafoni Region, Tbilisi, 2002, 31 pages
 20 centuries of Christianity in Georgia (a guide-book in Georgian and English), Tbilisi, 2004, 18 pages
 Problems of Georgian National Consciousness, Tbilisi, 2004, 125 pages
 Ephraim II, Catholicos-Patriarch of all Georgia, Tbilisi, 2007, 148 pages
 Ilia II, His Holiness and Beatitude, Catholicos-Patriarch of all Georgia, Tbilisi, 2008, 486 pages
 Ambrose, His Holiness and Beatitude, Catholicos-Patriarch of all Georgia, Tbilisi, 2009, 210 pages
 Callistratus, His Holiness and Beatitude, Catholicos-Patriarch of all Georgia, Tbilisi, 2009, 208 pages
 Christophorus, His Holiness and Beatitude, Catholicos-Patriarch of all Georgia, Tbilisi, 2009, 200 pages
 Georgian Bishops (XX-XXI centuries), Tbilisi, 2010, 513 pages
 A History of the Orthodox Church of Georgia, 1811 to the Present (in English, Switzerland, 2006, co-author. (1917-2002)

References

External links
 A History of the Orthodox Church of Georgia, 1811 to the Present (in English, Switzerland, 2006, co-author. (1917-2002).

 სერგო ვარდოსანიძე – აკადემიური საბჭოს თავმჯდომარე, რექტორი
 სერგო ვარდოსანიძე  // ბურუსი
 სერგო ვარდოსანიძის ბიოგრაფია // თბილისის სასულიერო აკადემია და სემინარია

1956 births
21st-century historians from Georgia (country)
Educators from Georgia (country)
Living people
20th-century historians from Georgia (country)